Liverpool Hope University (abbreviated LHU) is a public university with campuses in Liverpool, England. ‌The university grew out of three teacher training colleges: Saint Katharine's College (originally Warrington Training College), Notre Dame College, and Christ's College. Uniquely in European higher education, the university has an ecumenical tradition, with Saint Katharine's College having been Anglican and Notre Dame and Christ's both Catholic. The Anglican Bishop of Liverpool David Sheppard and the Catholic Archbishop of Liverpool Derek Worlock (who give their names to the university's Sheppard-Worlock Library) played a prominent role in its formation. Its name derives from Hope Street, the road which connects the city's Anglican and Catholic cathedrals, where graduation ceremonies are alternately held.

The university is both a research and teaching intensive institution. It has gained notable recognition for its teaching. In the late 2010s it achieved a Gold rating in the UK Government's Teaching Excellence Framework (TEF), and rankings in teaching-focused league tables is comparable with lower-performing Russell Group universities.

Former Vice Chancellor Professor Gerald Pillay OBE summarised the university as a liberal arts college-style environment where "[students are] a name, not a number." Its "small and beautiful" ethos has been contrasted with the larger neighbouring University of Liverpool and Liverpool John Moores University (LJMU).

History

The Victorian colleges
The university's earliest origins lie in the "Warrington Training College" set up in 1844 under the auspices of the Rector of Warrington Horatio Powys. Powys, who has a lecture theatre named in his honour in the EDEN Building, was the first Secretary of the Board of Education set up by the Diocese of Chester in 1839. The Warrington Training College was the second college set up by the Chester Diocesan Board within the current boundaries of Cheshire; the first having been established in Chester itself in 1839 (similarly the point of origin of the University of Chester). With the Chester college having been designed to train its (male) schoolmasters, the Warrington college was set up as a counterpart to train female teachers for the diocesan elementary schools.

In 1856 the second of the university's predecessor colleges, "Our Lady's Training College", also referred to as "Notre Dame" and "Mount Pleasant", was opened by the Sisters of Notre Dame de Namur. Like Warrington Training College, Notre Dame provided education to women. Researchers have noted that while both colleges educated women, Notre Dame "offered a broad-based education" unlike the "more domestic expectations in the education of women" which prevailed at Warrington Training College.

In 1930 Warrington Training College arrived in Liverpool, moving to the Taggart Avenue site having relocated initially to Battersea in London following a fire that had destroyed the college's original Warrington building in 1923. Its new home was the then-newly constructed building that still stands. Designed by the London-based Scottish architects Slater & Moberly at a cost of £170,000 (equivalent to approximately £10m in 2019) in partnership with a young Reginald Uren (who handled the construction phase), it is described by Historic England as being laid out "on a grand scale with accomplished Vernacular Revival styling reminiscent of Lutyens' Home Counties architecture" and "[an] impressive main court [that] maximises views over the Rector's Lawn and is complemented by a cloister-like rear quadrangle".

In 1938 the college was renamed "Saint Katharine's Training College", after the patron saint of learning Katharine of Alexandria.

A third college and university affiliation 
In 1930, by coincidence the same year as Saint Katharine's (then Warrington) Training College arrived in Liverpool, the Victoria University of Manchester (VUM) and the University of Liverpool had set up a Training College Examinations Board covering the teacher training colleges that existed at that point within Lancashire – which at that time included both Merseyside and Greater Manchester – and Cheshire. This followed the blueprint for universities being involved in "Joint Examining Boards" for teacher training, initiated by the Board of Education in 1926 and based on the idea of making the curriculum and organisation of teacher education more in tune with other forms of higher education.

Both Notre Dame (in the guise of Mount Pleasant Training College) and Warrington Training College were on a list of eight such colleges overseen by the VUM/University of Liverpool Examinations Board; among the others were the Diocesan Training College in Chester (the future University of Chester) and the non-denominational Edge Hill Training College in Ormskirk (forerunner of Edge Hill University). Initially two colleges based in Manchester were involved, but over time these withdrew from the scheme and it became exclusively a University of Liverpool venture, with the training colleges defined as the University of Liverpool's Associated Colleges.

In 1964 Saint Katharine's Training College was renamed simply as Saint Katharine's College, and, in the same year, Christ's College was opened to students on the opposite side of Taggart Avenue. Christ's had been founded by the Catholic Education Council and upon its creation enrolled like Saint Katharine's and Notre Dame as one of the University of Liverpool's Associated Colleges. Unlike Notre Dame, it admitted male students and was the first Catholic co-educational teachers' training college in England.

In 1974 the three colleges (along with the other colleges included in the venture) became formally integrated into the University of Liverpool's management structure via its new Board of College Studies. Instead of Associated Colleges, they were now re-designated as Affiliated Colleges. The Board of College Studies had "quasi-faculty status" and was the vehicle for a validation agreement which formalised the ability of the colleges (consented to by the University of Liverpool the previous year) to offer a general BA degree. Students who excelled were allowed to complete their studies to honours level at the University of Liverpool itself, though in practice few students from Saint Katharine's, Notre Dame or Christ's did so.

Federation and merger of colleges
The 1972 James Report had forecast a future reduction in teacher training intakes due to an oversupply of trained teachers in the context of the post-baby boom decline in the UK's birth rate since the mid-1960s. In response, the three colleges set up a joint committee in 1973 to discuss federation, establishing an Interim Federal Academic Council in 1974. The momentum towards federation was increased in the mid-1970s when the two Victorian colleges (along with similar institutions across the UK) were served with notice of imminent closure by the Government. Unlike Saint Katharine's and Notre Dame, Christ's was not earmarked for closure given its more modern provenance and also its success at the time.

As the proposed federation promised to bring together Catholic and Anglican education it was supported by Archbishop Worlock and Bishop Sheppard as "a major plank of their wider ecumenical vision for the city". A visit to London by the two men was instrumental to the granting of permission from the education minister, who reputedly agreed "as an expedient" to placate the two men, believing that the proposed federation would be short-lived.

In 1979 the federation was formally completed, with the three colleges becoming the constituents of a new body: Liverpool Institute of Higher Education (LIHE). The following year the two Catholic colleges merged, continuing on Christ's' Taggart Avenue site as Christ's and Notre Dame College (CND).

During the 1980s the two colleges Saint Katharines and CND co-existed under the umbrella of LIHE, with rationalisations gradually taking place to reduce the duplication of functions. However, whilst on an administrative level this was generally accomplished, at the end of the 1980s and into the 1990s there were still two libraries on the combined LIHE campus, as well as two chapels. (It was not until the 2000s that the modernist chapel formerly of Christ's became the only chapel at the Taggart Avenue site, with the Saint Katharine's chapel converted into a senate chamber.) Student social life was also largely carried on separately in the two colleges.

In 1990 the colleges merged and LIHE became a single institution as opposed to a federation of two colleges. The colleges therefore finally ceased to exist as academic entities.

Greater independence and a new name
The 1988 Teaching and Higher Education Act had imposed a new accountability framework which made the "tutelage relationship" with the University of Liverpool more inconvenient for LIHE in the early 1990s. In response to the 1988 Act, the validation agreement which operated through the Board of College Studies was tightened. University of Liverpool staff were now required to be present at LIHE subject management meetings and to be consulted over any proposed academic changes, however small.

In 1994 these constraints resulted in the replacement of the validation agreement with an accreditation agreement from the University of Liverpool which gave LIHE autonomy to validate undergraduate degrees on its own. With the change also applying to the former Diocesan Training College in Chester (by that point renamed as Chester College of Higher Education and the only other remaining Affiliated College), the University of Liverpool's College Studies Unit was disbanded the same year.

In 1995 it was decided to rename LIHE, which formally assumed the name Liverpool Hope University College (shortened to "Liverpool Hope" or simply "Hope"). The name-change represented an attempt to establish a more striking, characterful identity that reflected the original religious purpose of the three founding colleges. Reflecting upon the renaming in 2003, Elford asserted that "Hope is now arguably one of the most mission-explicit Christian institutions in British higher education".

The Taggart Avenue site was accordingly renamed Hope Park, with the site of the former St Francis Xavier's School site in Everton (the school itself having moved to Woolton in the 1960s) being purchased and developed as the Creative Campus in 1999.

Full maturity and the present-day university
Hope achieved taught degree awarding powers in 2002, and three years later was awarded university status, becoming Liverpool Hope University. Research degree awarding powers and full independence followed in 2009.

Late 2010s

For many years the university did not take part in university league tables. Upon entering for the first time in 2015 (for the 2016 editions), the university increased its positions, notably in the Guardian league table (which excludes research metrics). In the 2018 table announced in May 2017, the university outperformed its more prestigious neighbour the University of Liverpool for the first time, a fact used by the student news site The Tab in a 2018 April Fool's Day hoax that the University of Liverpool would lose its Russell Group status.

The university peaked in the 2019 edition of the Guardian table at 33rd (out of 121 universities), outranking the University of Liverpool for a second time and also other Russell Group universities including Manchester, Cardiff, Sheffield, Queen's Belfast, and King's College London. Dropping 10 places to 43rd, it remained ahead of the latter three universities and again, for a third year running the University of Liverpool in the 2020 edition announced in June 2019.

In total, the university climbed 71 places in three years, with a rise of 25 places in the 2017 edition and 23 places in both the 2018 and 2019 editions.

TEF Gold
In June 2017 the university was awarded Gold by the UK Government's Office for Students in its Teaching Excellence Framework. It was one of two universities in the Liverpool metro area (the other being Edge Hill) to achieve this rating. The university (alongside Coventry and Nottingham Trent) was named by the Guardian as one of the "excellent modern universities" who had been "rewarded with gold ratings, while some Russell Group institutions had to suffer the indignity of being awarded bronze".

Campuses
The university has two teaching campuses. 

The larger of these (though still small, with a built area occupying around 30 acres) is Hope Park in Childwall, in the vicinity of Childwall Woods and Calderstones Park.

Sheppard-Worlock Library
The Sheppard-Worlock Library is the university's main library. Located at Hope Park (there is also a small library at the Creative Campus), it is blended in to the Hilda Constance Allen Building, extending upwards an original low-rise block running east–west between two wings at the building's northern end. Previously the space had been occupied partly by kitchen and dining facilities.

The library was constructed in 1997 at a cost of £5.34m. A£1.5m refurbishment in 2012 included the creation of a British Standard vault for its special collections.

Special collections

The university's specialist campus for music and visual and performing arts teaching is the Creative Campus in Everton next to St Francis Xavier's Church. The university also has a residential-only campus, Aigburth Park in St Michael's, and Plas Caerdeon, an outdoor education centre in Snowdonia, North Wales.

The university's teaching campuses contain three Grade II listed buildings. One of these is the former main building of Saint Katharine's College at Hope Park, now renamed as the Hilda Constance Allen Building. The Creative Campus includes the other two: the former Saint Francis Xavier's School (now the Cornerstone Building) designed by Henry Clutton, and the former LSPCC (Liverpool Society for the Prevention of Cruelty to Children) building at 3 Islington Square.

Hope Park is bisected by Taggart Avenue, which runs north–south through the middle of the campus and divides the former sites of two of the university's three predecessor colleges. On the western side of Taggart Avenue is the former campus of Christ's College, while the eastern side (which besides Hilda Constance Allen also includes the EDEN Building and the Sheppard-Worlock Library) was formerly the campus of Saint Katharine's. In the era when the two colleges existed, high walls ran along both sides of Taggart Avenue, physically separating the institutions.

The university's third predecessor college, Notre Dame, was located on Mount Pleasant at its corner with Hope Street. Its former property, which it vacated in 1980, was acquired by Liverpool Polytechnic and became part of the campus of LJMU, the polytechnic's successor institution. Together with an adjoining townhouse it forms LJMU's John Foster Building.

Organisation and administration
The university follows a Christian principle to avoid bank loans and has not taken out a new bank loan since the mid-2000s. Expenditure is financed from university cash reserves, and the university budget is set from zero each year with only permanent staffing rolled over. In 2018 the university established an Income Generation Plan to diversify income streams away from a reliance on undergraduate tuition fees.

Elford's The Foundation of Hope discusses how brand management was of particular importance to the university in the 1990s, with the inception of the "Hope brand" in 1995: "The Hope brand was vigorously developed and marketed"; "New corporate colours [were developed]". The university had previously struggled to unite its three predecessor colleges into a single corporate identity, with "internal dissonances" persisting. Elford argues that, during its time as Liverpool Institute of Higher Education, the university "had effectively failed to establish an identity of its own".

The university adopted red as the main corporate colour of the Hope brand, contrasted primarily with white. It is the only university in the Liverpool metro area that uses red, a corporate colour more commonly associated with universities elsewhere in the historic "red rose" county of Lancashire (in particular Lancaster, Salford and UCLan). The university uses red for spiritual/theological rather than geographical/historical reasons. Its original (1995–2006) logo (the word "hope" written in red in lower case italics with the tail of the "e" turning upwards and encircling the word) can be found in The Foundation of Hope on the book's title page and rear cover.

In 2016/17 the university began using its coat of arms as its sole corporate logo, emphasising its brand heritage. This involved retiring its most recent modern logo, which had been designed in partnership with the London-based creative agency Fabrik in 2006. (The graphical package produced with Fabrik also included a typeface and general layout and colour-scheme principles for university publications that continued to be used after 2016/17.) The 2006 logo included a red rectangle with the university's name written in white, accompanied by a white Star of Bethlehem in the upper-right corner (this being appropriate to the Star of Bethlehem being a Star in the East: the upper part of the rectangle signifying the sky and east being on the right-hand side of the map). The logo also included the legend EST. 1844 in the bottom-right, a feature which survived after 2016 (sometimes rendered Est. 1844) in the university's variant presentations of its coat of arms in letterheads and other graphical uses. For the 175th anniversary of that year in 2019 the university also presented its coat of arms alongside the legend "175 YEARS OF ACADEMIC EXCELLENCE". In this legend "175" was rendered in gold to reflect the university's TEF Gold rating for Teaching Excellence achieved two years earlier.

Academic profile

Schools and Departments
The university comprises eight schools and two departments. It is a flat organisation as the eight schools do not contain departments (though the schools are divided less formally into subject teams) and schools/departments are not grouped upwards into middle-management-level faculties.

The School of Creative and Performing Arts is located at the Creative Campus, with all other schools/departments at Hope Park.

In  the university had 305 academic staff. 230 of these (75.41%) were qualified to doctoral level, placing the university 16th highest in the UK on this measure. The university's aim is for 85% of its academic staff to have doctorates and the remainder to be Professional Tutors with industry experience in areas such as education, law and accountancy.

Cathedrals Group
The university is a member of the Cathedrals Group. Within this mission group, the university validates and awards the degrees of PhD and MPhil for Newman University and St Mary's University, Twickenham.

International partnerships
The university has a number of international partnerships with other academic institutions, many of whom are Christian universities. Major partners include Université Catholique de Lille in France, Christ University and Stella Maris College in India, two American liberal arts colleges Hope College and Ouachita Baptist University, and Sun Yat-sen University in China.

Network of Hope
The university's Network of Hope was established in 1998 as a set of partnerships with Catholic sixth-form colleges in the North West. Current Network of Hope partners include Carmel College in St Helens, Holy Cross College in Bury, St John Rigby College in Wigan, and St Mary's College in Blackburn.

Everton FC
In 2016 the university signed a five-year partnership agreement with Everton Football Club. The partnership included a monitoring and evaluation project on the club's Everton in the Community Free School (opened in 2011) and graduate scholarships to research the club's history.

Awards

Research
The university has 12 research projects/centres:
 Andrew F. Walls Centre for the Study of African and Asian Christianity
 Archbishop Desmond Tutu Centre for War and Peace Studies
 Association for Continental Philosophy of Religion
 Centre for Christian Education and Pastoral Theology
 Centre for Culture and Disability Studies (CCDS)
 Centre for Education and Policy Analysis (CEPA)
 Irish Studies Research Group
 Ministry Research Project
 Popular Culture Research Group
 Sand Dune and Shingle Network
 Sarcopenia Ageing Trial
 Socio-Economic and Applied Research for Change (SEARCH)

Student life

Halls of residence

There are 12 halls of residence for students enrolled at the university. (The university runs a free shuttle bus between the campuses.)

Students' Union
Students at the university are represented by the Students' Union (HopeSU), which is affiliated to the National Union of Students.

Student body

In  the university had  students including  undergraduates and  postgraduates, making it the  largest university in the UK (out of the  universities included in HESA statistics). The university is less than half the size of the other two universities in the Liverpool metro area with comparable histories, Edge Hill ( students) and its elder sister Chester ( students).

Comparison with similarly sized UK universities
The university has a greater number and proportion of postgraduates than four of the six universities closest to it in size.

Noted people

Chancellors
2006–2013: Caroline Cox, Baroness Cox
2013–2020: Charles Guthrie, Baron Guthrie of Craigiebank
2020–: Monica Grady

Vice Chancellors and Rectors
1980–1995: James Burke
1995–2003: Simon Lee
2003–2022: Gerald Pillay
2023–: Claire Ozanne

Academics
Frank Cottrell-Boyce
Salman Al-Azami
Richard Harries, Baron Harries of Pentregarth
Helen King
Michael Murphy
Deryn Rees-Jones
Matt Simpson
Andrew Walls

Alumni

Arts
Heather Craney, actress
Simon Gilbert, journalist and author
Amy Hughes, artist
Terry Molloy, actor
Michael Murphy, poet
Malik Al Nasir, poet and author
Stel Pavlou, screenwriter and novelist
Willy Russell, playwright
Mary Lu Zahalan, singer and actress

Politics
David Alton, Baron Alton of Liverpool, former Liberal Democrat MP for Liverpool Mossley Hill and Liverpool Edge Hill
Steve Brine, Conservative MP for Winchester
Peter Kilfoyle, former Labour MP for Liverpool Walton
Paul Nuttall, politician
Mike Storey, Baron Storey, former Leader of Liverpool City Council

Sport
Diane Allahgreen, athlete
Emma Hayes MBE, Chelsea F.C. Women manager
Colm McFadden, Gaelic footballer
Jenny Meadows, athlete

See also
 Armorial of UK universities
 College of Education
 List of universities in the UK

References

Bibliography

External links

 
Educational institutions established in 2005
2005 establishments in England
Universities UK